Pisagua was a four-masted barque that was built for F. Laeisz, Hamburg, Germany in 1892 and served for twenty years, surviving a collision with  in 1912. She was repaired and sold to a Norwegian owner, only to be stranded in the South Shetland Islands the following year.

Description
Joh. C. Tecklenborg of Geestemünde built Pisagua as yard number 115. She had four masts and was rigged as a barque, with royal sails over double top and topgallant sails. Pisaguas code letters were RJPT.

History
Pisagua was launched on 23 September 1892. In that year she sailed to Valparaiso, Chile. Her voyage from Lizard Point to Valparaiso taking 71 days. In 1893 she made the voyage from Iquique, Chile to Lizard Point in 74 days. She sailed between Germany and Chile until 1896 when she made the voyage from Lizard Point to Calcutta, India in 99 days. In 1897, she sailed from Calcutta to Boston, United States in 111 days. She then sailed from Philadelphia to Hiogo, Japan in 131 days, the voyage from there to Iquique took 72 days.

In 1901, Pisagua sailed from Lizard Point to Port Pirie, Australia in 79 days, and from there to Taltal, Chile in a further 32 days. In 1904, she was again employed on the route to Chile, sailing from Elbmündung, Germany to Valparaiso in 87 days. Further voyages were made to Chile in 1907 and 1908.

Nine people died when one of Oceanas lifeboats capsized, but the other 241 passengers and crew were rescued. Oceana sank but Pisagua survived with severe damage to the bow and foremast.

P&O sued Laeisz, claiming damages for the loss of Oceana. Judgement was given that Pisagua was not at fault, due to a combination of factors, including that the obligation was on Oceana to give way to Pisagua under the "steam gives way to sail" rule.

Pisagua was towed to Dover, Kent for repairs. Pisagua was then towed to Hamburg where she was condemned. In October 1912, she was sold to A/S Ørnen, Sandefjord, Norway for £5,000. Pisagua was rebuilt as a whale factory. She was operated by Søren L. Christensen. On 12 February 1913, Pisagua was stranded at Low Island, South Shetland Islands. Although she was insured for NOK 318,000, her owners made a loss of NOK 54,713 on the ship.

Captains
The captains of Pisagua were:-
 J Früdden (1892–93)
 C E F J Bahlke (1893-1901)
 Hinrich Nissen (1901–03)
 H A Dehnhardt (1904–08)
 J Frömcke (1909)
 R Dahm (1910–12)
 Larsen (1912–13)

References

1892 ships
Ships built in Bremen (state)
Barques
Merchant ships of the German Empire
Tall ships of the German Empire
Merchant ships of Norway
Tall ships of Norway
Maritime incidents in 1912
Maritime incidents in 1913
Shipwrecks in the Southern Ocean
1913 in Antarctica